Ivan Goi (born 29 February 1980) is an Italian motorcycle road racer. He currently competes in the CIV Superbike Championship aboard a BMW S1000RR.

Racing career
Goi competed in the 125cc World Championship from 1996 to 2000 and in 2002; he had his best year in this competition in 1996, when he won the 125cc Austrian Grand Prix, becoming the then youngest rider to win a race in Grands Prix at 16 years and 157 days of age, and finished in tenth place in the final standings, as in 2000. In 2001 he debuted in the Supersport World Championship, where he raced also in 2003 and 2005, and he competed in selected events of the Superbike World Championship in 2006 and 2014.

At national level, Goi won the CIV Stock 1000 Championship in 2010 and in 2012 and the CIV Superbike Championship in 2014.

Career statistics

Grand Prix motorcycle racing

Races by year
(key)

Supersport World Championship

Races by year
(key)

Superbike World Championship

Races by year
(key)

References

External links
Ivan Goi career statistics at MotoGP.com
Ivan Goi career statistics at WorldSBK.com

1980 births
People from Casalmaggiore
Italian motorcycle racers
125cc World Championship riders
Superbike World Championship riders
Living people
Supersport World Championship riders
Sportspeople from the Province of Cremona